Mount Pleasant, United States Virgin Islands
Mount Pleasant, Saint Croix, United States Virgin Islands
Mount Pleasant, Saint John, United States Virgin Islands